Live From Seoul With Luv, is the first online live concert by South Korean boy group Monsta X. It was live-streamed through LiveXLive on August 9, 2020. Originally, the group planned to conduct their fourth world tour, but the offline performance was canceled due to COVID-19 pandemic, and an online paid concert was held.

Background
On June 22, Starship Entertainment announced that Monsta X is ready to take the stage, for their one and only live-streamed concert, later this summer. Presented by LiveXLive (now LiveOne), it will take place on July 25 and feature the group performing a combination of English-language tracks from their studio album All About Luv and Korean-language hits for a one-of-a-kind show. The virtual event also promises to include exclusive behind-the-scenes footage of the sextet, as well as VIP experiences like exclusive Monsta X merch and online meet and greets with fans.

On July 13, the agency announced that the online concert will be delayed and to be live-streamed two weeks later on August 9 due to Shownu's left eye retinal detachment surgery recovery.

On August 6, Monsta X surprise reveals the practice site ahead of their online concert performance.

On September 24, the exclusive behind-the-scenes footage of Monsta X's rehearsals and performances were released through Naver V Live's channel, from episodes 191 to 194, a total of four episodes.

Viewership
On August 11, Starship Entertainment announced that the concert, with the price that ranges from $19.99 to $149.99, was viewed from 126 countries around the world.

Impact
According to LiveXLive, this recent PPV event with Monsta X sold out the VIP tickets in under two minutes, and regular ticket sales for the live-stream added up to the equivalent of a sold out show at Staples Center.

Monsta X's online concert also topped that week's overall virtual concerts.

Setlist

 "Follow"
 "Dramarama"
MENT 
 "Play It Cool"
 "Monsta Truck"
MENT 
 "Happy Without Me"
 "Middle of the Night"
MENT 
 "Flow"
VCR

MENT 
 "Misbehave"
 "Who Do U Love?"

MENT 
 "Shoot Out"
 "Hero"
MENT 
 "Fantasia"
VCR

ENDING MENT
 "Stand Up"

Notes:
 Special Talk With Luv (#HOW_I_STAY_AT_HOME)
 Special Talk With Luv (#BEHIND_THE_SCENE)
 By My Side (Self MV)

Personnel

Artists
 Shownu
 Minhyuk
 Kihyun 
 Hyungwon
 Joohoney
 I.M

Presented
 Starship Entertainment 
 LiveXLive

Organized
 Shownote
 CJ ENM

Ticketing
 LiveXLive

References

External links
  

Monsta X concert tours
2020 concerts
K-pop concerts